HBO Latin America was a company that owned and distributed several television channels in the region of Latin America. It was originally founded as a joint venture between Time Warner and Ole Communications in 1991 with the launch of HBO in the region. The HBO Brazilian channel was launched in 1994.  In 1990s Sony and Disney became shareholders and left in 2010. The company later began distributing other channels from companies such as Turner, Sony, A&E and NBCUniversal.

In October 2019, WarnerMedia announced an agreement with Ole to acquire the latter's minority interest. HBO Brasil, which is another joint venture of HBO with Ole was not affected by the transaction. WarnerMedia and Ole Communications continued their basic television channel distribution in Latin America. Eventually, the company folded into WarnerMedia in May 2020 (now Warner Bros. Discovery Americas).

Operating channels
HBO Latin America Group owns and operates these channels, which will be acquired by WarnerMedia: (most of those are simulcast in HD):
 HBO Latin America (formerly known as HBO Ole)
 HBO 2
 HBO+ (formerly known as HBO Ole 2 and HBO Plus)
 HBO Family
 HBO Signature
 HBO Mundi (formerly known as Max)
 HBO Pop (formerly known as Max Up)
 HBO Xtreme (formerly known as Max Prime)
 Cinemax Latin America (Since 2009 as an ad-supported basic cable network)

HBO Brasil (Brazil) is operated by HBO Brasil Partners, a separate partnership between WarnerMedia and Ole.

HBO Caribbean is operated as a division of HBO Latin America.

Distributed channels
WarnerMedia distributes the following channels:

Owned by A+E Networks Latin America (owned by A+E Networks and Ole Communications):
 History Latin America
 H2 Latin America (started in July 2014 to replace Bio.)
 A&E Latin America
 Lifetime Latin America (started in June 2014 to replace Sony Spin)

NBCUniversal International Networks Latin America:
 E! Latin America (owned by Comcast/NBCUniversal and Ole Communications)
 Telemundo Internacional (except in Mexico. Owned by Comcast/NBCUniversal and Ole Communications)
 Universal TV (except in Brazil, where the channel is operated by a 50/50 joint venture between NBCU and Canais Globo and distributed by Canais Globo)
 Studio Universal (except in Brazil, where the channel is operated by a 50/50 joint venture between NBCU and Canais Globo and distributed by Canais Globo)
 Syfy (except in Brazil, where the channel is operated by a 50/50 joint venture between NBCU and Canais Globo and distributed by Canais Globo)

Sony Pictures Entertainment:
 Sony Channel
 AXN

Warner Bros. Entertainment (operated by Warner Bros. Discovery International):
 Warner

OLE Communications
 IVC Network

Defunct channels
 Animax
 Bio.
 Locomotion
 Sony Spin
 Hallmark Channel
 TV Quality
 Tele Uno
 Mundo Olé
 A&E Mundo
 USA Network
 Calle 13
 Sci-Fi
 Movietime
 CBS Telenoticias
 HBO Family
 HBO HD

See also
 Turner Broadcasting System
 WarnerMedia

References

External links
Official Website

Latin America
HBO Latin America Group
Latin American cable television networks
Warner Bros.
Mass media companies established in 1991
Mass media companies disestablished in 2020